Azamuddin Bin Mohd Akil (born 16 April 1985), commonly known as Alex, is a Malaysian footballer who plays for Penang. Because of his pacy style of play, he is always used as a forward.

Early life
Born in Relong, a village located in Kuala Lipis, he is also known as Alex among teammates. Alex started his career as a footballer with  Pahang FA President's Cup Team under-19 as the main striker in the Youth Cup in 2003.

Club career

Youth career
He began his professional football career with  Shahzan Muda FC President's Cup Team in 2005, at the age of 20. After showing encouraging performances, he signed first professional contract with Shahzan Muda FC. In 2008, he joined UPB MyTeam FC.

UPB-MyTeam
After impressed with Shahzan Muda, he decided to join UPB-MyTeam for 2008–2009 season. But his career at Myteam was not long enough after the management of UPB-MyTeam was withdrew from Malaysia League for 2010 season because financial problem. Thus, he returned to Pahang.

Pahang
UPB MyTeam FC lead to the dissolution of these players returned to the former team, Pahang and partner together with veteran striker, Azizul Kamaludin. In the years 2010 to 2011, he made his name as a main striker but suffered a hamstring injury that forced him to miss several games. After recovering, he returned to the team, but failed to help Pahang remain in the Malaysia Super League. For 2012 season, he was once again to be top scorer for Pahang and help the team to be promoted to Malaysia super league 2013. He continued to advance further in his games and he became one of Pahang's key player throughout the season. At the peak of his performance, on 3 November 2013, he superbly assisted Pahang to defeat Kelantan (0–1) in the Malaysian Cup final which ends Pahang's 21 years drought of the cup. He was then nominated the best player of the tournament.

Loan To Kelantan
In 2011 Malaysia Cup, he went on loan to Kelantan and manage to score 6 goals for the team.

Return To Pahang
For 2012 season, he was once again to be top scorer for Pahang and help the team to be promoted to Malaysia super league 2013. He continued to advance further in his games and he became one of Pahang's key player throughout the season. At the peak of his performance, on 3 November 2013, he superbly assisted Pahang to defeat Kelantan (0–1) in the Malaysian Cup final which ends Pahang's 21 years drought of the cup. He was then nominated the best player of the tournament.

Johor Darul Ta'zim

On 17 December 2015, Azamuddin signed for 2015 AFC Cup winners Johor Darul Ta'zim on a two-year deal. He made his debut as substitute on 13 February 2016 against Selangor in the 2016 Charity Shield, which JDT won on penalties. That day, he also made his first appearance with the club on the first Super League matches.

On 16 February 2016, Azamuddin scored his first JDT goal against T–Team in the 28th minute of the game. He collected his first Super League title winner's medal at the end of the 2016 season.

Selangor

After two seasons with Johor Darul Ta'zim, Azamuddin signed a one-year contract with another Malaysian club Selangor on a free transfer.

Kedah
On 1 December 2018, Azamuddin Akil agreed to join Malaysia Super League side Kedah Darul Aman.

International career
In Mac 2012, Mohd Azamuddin Akil was among the national team's recruits for the friendly against Sarawak FA in Kuching on 24 March.
The 26-year-old from Kuala Lipis has been in top form for Pahang FA, having scored seven goals in the Premier League.

National coach Datuk K. Rajagopal is preparing the team for the Asean Football Federation (AFF) Championship in November.

On 28 April 2012, he scored the first international goal for the senior team in a friendly match against Sri Lanka. He scored in another game against Singapore giving Malaysia the lead on 8 June 2012. On 30 July 2012, he scored the only Malaysia Selection goal in a friendly match against Manchester City with Malaysia XI lost 3–1 to Premier League champion.

Malaysian coach K. Rajagobal has announced his 22-man squad for the side's AFF Suzuki Cup title defence which starts on 25 November. Rajagobal has dropped three players from the initial 25-man squad, with goalkeeper Izham Tarmizi omitted in favour of Kelantan's Khairul Fahmi and veteran Farizal Marlias from Perak.ATM defender Irwan Fadzli Idrus all misses out, along with Zaquan Adha, who is left out after injuring himself in Harimau Malaysia's final warm-up friendly against Bangladesh on Tuesday.
He has been replaced by Pahang' Azamuddin Akil.

International statistics

Honours

Club
Pahang
 Malaysia Cup: 2013, 2014
 Malaysia FA Cup: 2014
 Malaysian Charity Shield: 2014

Johor Darul Takzim
 Malaysia FA Cup: 2016
 Malaysian Charity Shield: 2016
 Malaysia Super League: 2016, 2017
 Malaysia Cup: 2017

Kedah 
 Malaysia FA Cup: 2019

International
Malaysia
 AFF Championship: Runner-up 2014

References

External links
 Alex, Razman tekad julang Harimau
 Goal Southeast Asia Player of the Week – Azamuddin Akil
 'Saya macam dalam mimpi'
 Alex minta rakan usah leka
 Alex optimis singkir PKNS
 Harap tuah Darul Makmur
 Azammuddin selamatkan Pahang
 Kapten baru Pahang kecewa
 Azamudin cari mangsa baharu
 Azamuddin tamat kemarau jaringan
 Lapan pemain Pahang rebut empat kekosongan

1985 births
Living people
Malaysian footballers
Malaysia international footballers
UPB-MyTeam FC players
Sri Pahang FC players
Kelantan FA players
People from Pahang
Malaysia Super League players
Association football wingers
Association football forwards